Qinglong Temple is a Buddhist temple located in Jishan County, Shanxi, China. The temple is renowned for its frescos which were painted in both Yuan and Ming dynasties (1127–1644).

History
Qinglong Temple was first constructed by Minister of Public Works Wang Zheng in 662, namely the 2nd year in the reign of Emperor Gaozong in the Tang dynasty (618–907).

Qinglong Temple has been rebuilt numerous times since the Yuan dynasty (1127–1368).

On June 25, 2001, it has been listed among the fifth batch of "Major National Historical and Cultural Sites in Shaanxi" by the State Council of China.

Architecture
Qinglong Temple consists of more than 10 buildings including shanmen, Main Hall, Middle Hall, Hall of Ten Kings of Hell, Hall of Guru, Hufa Hall, Hall of Sangharama Palace, east wing-room, west wing-room, etc. The temple still maintain the style of the Yuan and Ming dynasties (1127–1644).

National treasure
Inner walls of the Main Hall, Middle Hall and the Hall of Sangharama Palace are fully painted with frescos, most of them were made in the Ming dynasty (1368–1644), and the most famous are the Eighteen Arhats, Three-Life Buddha, Ten Kings of Hell, and Ten Thousands of Taoist Gods.

References

Buddhist temples in Shanxi
Buildings and structures in Yuncheng
Tourist attractions in Yuncheng
7th-century establishments in China
7th-century Buddhist temples
Religious buildings and structures completed in 662